The 2015 Third Division Football Tournament is the first season under its current league division format. The season begins in June.

Structure and rule changes
Third division will be played for two stages according to the changes brought to the 2015 season.

Zone stage
 Zone 1—8 includes clubs from all atolls of the Maldives.
 Zone 9 split into two groups.
 Male' clubs compete in Zone 9 group 1. 
 Offices and companies' recreation clubs compete in Zone 9 group 2.
 Each zone play separate competitions (Zone 9 groups also play separate competition). 
 Champion teams of all zones qualify for final stage (also referred as Male' round).

Final stage
 10 teams qualified for this stage divided into two even groups.
 Teams play against each other once.
 Top two teams of each group advance into semi-finals.
 Two finalists qualify tor next year's Second Division Football Tournament.

Teams
A total of 10 teams will be entering into the final stage of the competition.

Zone stage

Zone 1

Zone 2

Zone 3

Zone 4

Zone 5

Zone 6

Zone 7

Zone 8

Zone 9

Group 1

Group 2

Final stage

Group stage

Group A

Group B

Semi-finals

Final

References

Maldivian Third Division Football Tournament seasons
3